Zin Mar Win (born 2 January 1990) is a Burmese footballer who plays as a defender. She has been a member of the Myanmar women's national team.

See also
List of Myanmar women's international footballers

References

1990 births
Living people
Women's association football defenders
Burmese women's footballers
People from Ayeyarwady Region
Myanmar women's international footballers